16α-Hydroxyandrostenedione (16α-OH-A4), also known as 16α-hydroxyandrost-4-ene-3,17-dione, is an endogenous and naturally occurring steroid and metabolic intermediate in the biosynthesis of estriol during pregnancy. It is produced from dehydroepiandrosterone (DHEA), which is converted into 16α-hydroxy-DHEA sulfate, then desulfated and aromatized into 16α-hydroxyestrone, and finally converted into estriol by 17β-hydroxysteroid dehydrogenase.

See also
 15α-Hydroxydehydroepiandrosterone
 Androstenedione
 11β-Hydroxyandrostenedione

References

Androstanes
Steroid hormones